The 1998 New York Mets season was the 37th regular season for the Mets. Like the previous season, they finished the season with a record of 88–74.  Despite placing 2nd in the National League East, the Mets fell one game short of playoff contention following a catastrophic collapse during the final week of the season. They were managed by Bobby Valentine. They played home games at Shea Stadium.

Offseason
November 24, 1997: John Olerud was signed as a free agent with the New York Mets.
December 18, 1997: Dennis Cook was acquired from the Florida Marlins in exchange for Fletcher Bates and Scott Comer.
February 6, 1998: Al Leiter and Ralph Milliard were acquired from the Florida Marlins in exchange for A. J. Burnett, Jesus Sanchez, and Robert Stratton.

Regular season
Despite their collapse toward the end of the season, the 1998 season was notable for the Mets due in large part to the acquisition of All-Star catcher Mike Piazza. The Mets were in need of a catcher due to an injury suffered by their own star catcher Todd Hundley, and took advantage of both Piazza's disagreement over a new contract with the Los Angeles Dodgers and the ongoing salary dumping by the defending World Series champion Florida Marlins; unable to negotiate a deal, the Dodgers traded Piazza to the Marlins, who turned around several days later and dealt Piazza to the Mets for outfield prospect Preston Wilson, among others. Piazza contributed a .348 average with 23 home runs and 76 RBI during his time with the Mets and once again was voted to the National League All-Star team. Hundley, meanwhile, attempted to make a move to left field when he rejoined the team but it did not work and his tenure with the Mets was over at the end of the year when he was traded to the Dodgers.

John Olerud was again the hitting star for the Mets. He recorded a .354 average, the second best in all of baseball behind Larry Walker, and once again led the team with 93 RBI to go with his 22 home runs. On the pitching side, another Marlins castoff made his presence felt as Al Leiter had his career best marks as a starter. Leiter won a career high seventeen games and added a 2.47 ERA. Rick Reed continued his career renaissance by adding sixteen wins of his own.

Opening Day starters
Edgardo Alfonzo
Carlos Baerga
Bernard Gilkey
Butch Huskey
Bobby Jones
Brian McRae
John Olerud
Rey Ordóñez
Tim Spehr

The Mets played an unforgettable opening day game at Shea Stadium on March 31 against their division rival Philadelphia Phillies. Both of them were involved in the longest scoreless opening day game in the National League and the longest one in MLB since 1926 when the Washington Senators beat the Philadelphia Athletics 1–0 in 15 innings. The Mets won the game 1–0 in 14 innings when backup catcher Alberto Castillo delivered a full-count, two-out, pinch-hit single to right with the bases loaded off Philadelphia closer Ricky Bottalico. This was the first regular season baseball game played in New York in March.

Notable transactions
May 10, 1998: Steve Decker was signed as a free agent with the New York Mets.
 May 22, 1998: Mike Piazza was traded by the Florida Marlins to the New York Mets for Preston Wilson, Ed Yarnall, and Geoff Goetz (minors).
June 16, 1998: Rich Becker was selected off waivers by the Baltimore Orioles from the New York Mets.
July 3, 1998: Josías Manzanillo was signed as a free agent with the New York Mets.
July 31, 1998: Tony Phillips was traded by the Toronto Blue Jays to the New York Mets for Leo Estrella.
July 31, 1998: Bill Pulsipher was traded by the New York Mets to the Milwaukee Brewers for Mike Kinkade.

Season standings

Record vs. opponents

Roster

Player stats

Batting

Starters by position 
Note: Pos = Position; G = Games played; AB = At bats; H = Hits; Avg. = Batting average; HR = Home runs; RBI = Runs batted in

Other batters 
Note: G = Games played; AB = At bats; H = Hits; Avg. = Batting average; HR = Home runs; RBI = Runs batted in

Pitching

Starting pitchers 
Note: G = Games pitched; IP = Innings pitched; W = Wins; L = Losses; ERA = Earned run average; SO = Strikeouts

Other pitchers 
Note: G = Games pitched; IP = Innings pitched; W = Wins; L = Losses; ERA = Earned run average; SO = Strikeouts

Relief pitchers 
Note: G = Games pitched; W = Wins; L = Losses; SV = Saves; ERA = Earned run average; SO = Strikeouts

Farm system

LEAGUE CHAMPIONS: St. Lucie, Capital City

References

External links
1998 New York Mets at Baseball Reference
1998 New York Mets team page at www.baseball-almanac.com

New York Mets seasons
New York Mets
New York Mets
1990s in Queens